Dennis L. Smith is an American television cinematographer, director and former camera operator. 
Dennis began his career as a news photojournalists for ABC winning United Press InternatIonal and Associated Press "Best Newsfilm of the Year" awards for his Documentaries. He also contributed to winning two George Foster Peabody's from the University of Georgia.

In 1992, he began a 12-year-relationship with David E. Kelley, working with him on Picket Fences and The Practice.

As a camera operator he worked on such films as Stir Crazy (1980), Revenge of the Nerds (1984), License to Drive (1988) and Home Alone and Home Alone 2: Lost in New York (1990) and Purple Rain. He continued his career as a cinematographer/director of photography on the David E. Kelley series Picket Fences (in which he made his directorial debut) and The Practice.

Some of Smith's other directing credits include episodes of: Boston Legal, JAG, Numb3rs, The Vampire Diaries, Fringe, NCIS, NCIS: Los Angeles and NCIS: New Orleans.

Televisionography
 Picket Fences (1996)
 The Practice (1998)
 JAG (2002)
 NCIS (2003)
 Dr. Vegas (2004)
 Boston Legal (2004)
 Numbers (2005)
 Just Legal (2006)
 Moonlight (2007)
 Fringe (2009)
 The Vampire Diaries (2010)
 Royal Pains (2010)
 90210 (2010)
 NCIS: Los Angeles (2010)
 Person of Interest (2011)
 King & Maxwell (2013)
 NCIS: New Orleans (2014)
 Victims of Silence (2016)
 Station 19 (2018)

References

External links

American cinematographers
American television directors
Living people
Place of birth missing (living people)
Year of birth missing (living people)